Vincent van Gogh was a Dutch painter.

Vincent van Gogh may also refer to:
 Vincent van Gogh (Kodallı opera)
 Vincent van Gogh (Russell painting)

See also
 Van Gogh (disambiguation)